Motohiko Eguchi is a Judo athlete.  He serves as a captain of the Nihon University Judo Team. Eguchi received a degree in Economics at Nihon University, then moved to the US with Jerome Mackey. He had earned his 4th dan by age 23. He was the 1966 under-93 kg national Judo champion and was the grand champion in the 1966 national Judo championships.  He had served as the national guard champion in 1966, as well as the head coach of the Women's National Team in the 1985 Fukuoka Cup in  Fukuoka Japan. He currently holds an 8th dan in Judo.

References

Living people
Japanese male judoka
American male judoka
Japanese emigrants to the United States
Nihon University alumni
Judoka trainers
Year of birth missing (living people)